ML Fairness, short for Machine Learning Fairness, is an initiative by Google to implement fairness as a part of their machine learning techniques. The campaign is presented as a means to stop political bias in artificial intelligence.

References

Google
AI software
Google software
Google Search